Frank Wolff may refer to:

Frank Wolff (actor) (1928–1971), American actor
Frank Wolff (comics), fictional character from The Adventures of Tintin by Hergé

See also
Franklin Merrell-Wolff (1887–1985), American mystical philosopher
Francis Wolff, record producer
Frank Wolf (disambiguation)
Frank Wolfe (disambiguation)
Wolff